The Mechanized Infantry Brigade is a mechanized infantry formation of the Sri Lanka Army. This grouping created a highly mobile brigade equipped with Type 63, BMP-2 and WZ551 armoured personnel carriers.

Current formation 

1st Battalion, Mechanized Infantry Regiment
2nd Battalion, Mechanized Infantry Regiment
3rd Battalion, Mechanized Infantry Regiment
4th Battalion, Mechanized Infantry Regiment
5th (V) Battalion, Mechanized Infantry Regiment

See also
Mechanized Infantry Regiment

References

External links
 Sri Lanka Army

Brigades of the Sri Lanka Army
Mechanised brigades
Military units and formations established in 2007